Philip Cole Finegan II, known professionally as Cole Finegan, (born 1956) is an American lawyer who has served as the United States attorney for the District of Colorado since 2021. He served as Denver's City Attorney and Chief of Staff to then Denver Mayor John Hickenlooper from 2003 through 2006. He was also the regional managing partner of the Americas for Hogan Lovells and managing partner of the law firm's Denver office.

Early life and education 

Finegan was born in Tulsa, Oklahoma, and attended Cascia Hall Preparatory School. He attended the University of Notre Dame from 1974 to 1978, earning a degree in English. After graduating, Finegan worked full-time as Chief Legislative Aassistant and then Chief of Staff to U.S. Representative James R. Jones of Oklahoma, chair of the House Budget Committee. Finegan attended Georgetown University Law Center and graduated in 1986. He served as a member of The Tax Lawyer law review.

Career

Brownstein Hyatt Farber 

Tom Strickland and Andy Loewi recruited Finegan in early 1987 to join Brownstein Hyatt Farber Schreck (then Brownstein Hyatt Farber & Madden), a national law firm based in Denver, CO. From 1993 to 2003, Finegan was a partner in the Denver office and advised on land use, regulatory, municipal, legislative, and election law.

Political 

While working for Congressman Jones, Finegan managed his 1984 re-election and his bid for the U.S. Senate in 1986. Finegan was campaign manager for mayoral candidate Norm Early, who lost the 1991 election to Wellington Webb. From 1991 to 1993, Finegan served both as Chief Legal Counsel and Director of Policy and Initiatives for Colorado Governor Roy Romer.

Finegan acted as an adviser to Governor Hickenlooper and U.S. Senator Michael Bennet, and served as finance chair for Bennet's 2016 re-election campaign and was a co-chair of Hickenlooper's re-election campaign. He was one of four Colorado finance co-chairs for President Barack Obama's 2012 re-election campaign.

Hogan Lovells 

Finegan joined Hogan Lovells (then Hogan & Hartson) in 2007 as a partner. He became managing partner of Hogan Lovells' Denver office in May 2007, and focused his practice on public-private partnerships, regulatory issues, land use and development, and legislative and public policy law. In May 2013, Finegan was elected to the Hogan Lovells board as the representative for the Americas (excluding Washington, D.C.). Finegan was engaged in the development of L.C. Fulenwider Company's Aviation Station at 61st Avenue near Denver International Airport.

Finegan was selected as a "Lawyer of the Decade" by Law Week Colorado; as Lawyer of the Year 2013; and was also named one of the most influential people in Denver by 5280 magazine.

U.S. attorney for the District of Colorado 

On September 28, 2021, President Joe Biden nominated Finegan to be the United States attorney for the District of Colorado. On November 4, 2021, his nomination was reported out of committee by voice vote. On November 19, 2021, his nomination was confirmed by the United States Senate via voice vote. He was sworn into office on December 1, 2021, by Judge Christine Arguello.

Affiliations 

Finegan served on the board of directors of the Downtown Denver Partnership, Metro Denver Chamber of Commerce, The Children's Hospital, The Denver Foundation, Colorado Black Chamber of Commerce, and Teach for America. He also served as a member of the Colorado Forum, Quarterly Forum, and Economic Club of Denver.

Finegan served on the Denver Public Schools Foundation board of directors  and is also a past member of the Colorado I Have A Dream Foundation board of directors, the Legal Aid Foundation of Colorado board of directors,  the State Board of Agriculture, the State Board of Colleges, the Auraria Higher Education Center board, the Rocky Mountain Mutual Housing Association board, and the Greater Denver Corporation board.

References

External links
 Biography at U.S. Department of Justice

1956 births
Living people
20th-century American lawyers
21st-century American lawyers
Georgetown University Law Center alumni
Lawyers from Tulsa, Oklahoma
People associated with Hogan Lovells
United States Attorneys for the District of Colorado
Notre Dame College of Arts and Letters alumni